The Beatles Anthology is a book published in October 2000 as part of The Beatles Anthology film project. It includes interviews with all four band members, John Lennon, Paul McCartney, George Harrison and Ringo Starr, together with others involved, most notably producer George Martin, press officer Derek Taylor and roadie and head of Apple Corps, Neil Aspinall, who oversaw the project. 

The book, which is billed as the only autobiography of the Beatles, also features more than 1,200 rare photos and colour illustrations. Many of the interviews quoted are from those featured in the documentary films, and additional interviews were conducted specifically for the book. John Lennon's passages were accumulated from various archives and sources, including his December 1970 Rolling Stone interview, his September 1980 interview with Playboy and quotes from the 1968 biography of the band by Hunter Davies. The book went straight to the top of the New York Times bestsellers list. In 2002, the book was released as a large-format paperback.

References

External links
The Beatles Anthology, at Internet Archive

2000 non-fiction books
Books about the Beatles
British autobiographies
Music autobiographies
The Beatles Anthology
2000 anthologies